Anselmi is an Italian surname, a cognate of Anselm. Notable people with the surname include:

Adolfo L. Monserrate Anselmi (1909–1983), Puerto Rican politician
Albert Anselmi (1883–1929), American mobster
Enrico Anselmi, Italian racing driver
Fabrizio Anselmi (born 1978), Italian footballer
Federico Anselmi (born 1982), Argentine rugby referee
Franco Anselmi (terrorist) (1956-1978), Italian neofascist terrorist
Giorgio Anselmi (1723–1797), Italian painter
Giuseppe Anselmi (1876–1929), Italian opera singer
Humberto Monserrate Anselmi' American agronomist engineer of Puerto Rican descent
Lucia Contini Anselmi (1876–1913), Italian classical pianist and composer
Michelangelo Anselmi (c. 1492–1554), Italian painter
Renato Anselmi (1891–1973), Italian fencer
Rosina Anselmi (1880–1965), Italian stage, television and film actress
Thomas Anselmi, Canadian musician
Tina Anselmi (1927–2016), Italian politician and Italian resistance member
Tom Anselmi (born c. 1956), Canadian businessman
William Anselmi, Italian-born Canadian academic and writer

Italian-language surnames